Draba incana is a species of flowering plant belonging to the family Brassicaceae.

Its native range is Canada to Northern Central and Northeastern USA, Greenland, Northern Europe, Alps, Pyrenees.

References

incana